{{Infobox athlete
| name        = Mark English
| image       = 10019 Mark English.jpg
| caption     = Mark English at 2015 European Team Championships First League
| nationality = Irish
| sport       = Track and field
| event       = 800m
| birth_date  = 
| birth_place = 
| residence   = Letterkenny, County Donegal
| pb          = {{ubl|400 m (outdoor):
(outdoor): 1:44.70 (2021) |800 m (indoor): 1:46.10 (2021, NR) }}
| height      = 
| weight      = 
| medaltemplates = 

}}Mark English''' (born 18 March 1993) is an Irish middle-distance runner.

Early life
English's home town is Letterkenny in County Donegal. He attended secondary school at St Eunan's College. He only made the switch to athletics during his Transition Year, having previously played Gaelic football for Letterkenny Gaels at under-age level. While a member of Letterkenny Athletic Club in his teens, he tested himself against the Gaelic footballer Caolan Ward.

English studied medicine at University College Dublin (UCD), where his classmates included Dublin's multiple All-Ireland winning Gaelic footballer Jack McCaffrey—considered that sport's quickest player. English has issued a challenge to McCaffrey to take him on over 100 metres. After qualifying as a doctor in 2019, he initially intended to step aside from medical practice in order to focus on athletics full-time, but when the 2020 Olympics were postponed due to the COVID-19 pandemic, he took the opportunity to complete his 12-month medical internship.

Career
At the 2014 European Athletics Championships, English won a bronze medal in the 800 metres event. On 8 March at the 2015 European Athletics Indoor Championships in Prague, English won a silver medal.

In 2014, English finished 2nd at the Adidas Grand Prix as part of the 2014 IAAF Diamond League. English finished 4th at the 2014 IAAF Continental Cup, representing Team Europe.

In 2015, he finished 9th at the 2015 World Championships in Athletics in Beijing, China.

He represented Ireland at the 2016 Summer Olympics in Rio de Janeiro. Later that year, English ran the 2nd quickest of all-time for 500m at the Great CityGames, finishing 2nd to 2016 Olympic 800m winner David Rudisha. 

On 3 March 2019, English won a bronze medal in the 800 metres at the 2019 European Athletics Indoor Championships. Following this, the RTÉ analyst Jerry Kiernan (himself a former athlete) described English as historically the country's "greatest talent" in middle-distance running. Several years earlier, Kiernan had claimed that English was better than Michael Murphy — the All-Ireland winning football team captain long held to be his county's greatest ever athlete. Kiernan justified this remark with the comment: "[Murphy] is playing against lads from Monaghan. Mark English is running against Kenyans". 

In August 2019, English won the 800m at the Birmingham 2019 Diamond League. 

In August 2022, he won a bronze medal in the 800m at the 2022 European Athletics Championships in Munich.

Other work
English has been active in encouraging people to read more books.

References

External links
 

1993 births
Living people
Athletes (track and field) at the 2010 Summer Youth Olympics
Athletes (track and field) at the 2016 Summer Olympics
Athletes (track and field) at the 2020 Summer Olympics
Donegal Gaelic footballers
European Athletics Championships medalists
Irish male middle-distance runners
Olympic athletes of Ireland
People educated at St Eunan's College
People from Letterkenny
Sportspeople from County Donegal
World Athletics Championships athletes for Ireland